Johnathan Hoggard (born 15 November 2000 in Spalding) is a British racing driver who most recently competed in the FIA Formula 3 Championship for Jenzer Motorsport.

Career

Karting
Hoggard started karting in the UK when he was 13 years old. In the same year he became MSA British Junior Karting Champion.

British F4
Due to a successful karting campaign in 2016, Fortec Motorsports signed Hoggard up to race for them halfway through the 2017 British F4 season Hoggard scored his first points in the 3rd race at Snetterton where he finished tenth. At the penultimate round of the season in race three at Silverstone Hoggard finished 3rd, securing his first single seater podium of his career.
In 2018 Fortec signed Hoggard for a full season where he won 8 races and finished on the podium a further 2 times. Hoggard finished the season on 339 points and in 3rd position behind Kiern Jewiss and Ayrton Simmons who finished first and second respectively.

British F3
Following his performance in the British F4 series, Hoggard was again signed up by Fortec to race for them in British F3 championship in 2019. In the second race of the final round of the season himself and championship rival Clément Novalak collided meaning they both finished at the bottom end of the points. Hoggard finished 15th whereas Novalak finished 12th which gave Novalak 4 points, despite Hoggard winning the last race he still fell short of the title. He finished the season 23 points behind Novalak with 482 and 7 wins, more than anyone on the grid. His performances across the season also meant he won the Sunoco Whelen Challenge and with it, a drive at the 2020 24 Hours of Daytona with Precision Performance Motorsports.

Aston Martin Autosport BRDC Young Driver
Hoggard was nominated for the Aston Martin Autosport BRDC Young Driver in early November 2019 along with Enaam Ahmed, Jamie Chadwick and Ayrton Simmons. Hoggard won the award, and with it a cash prize of £200,000 and a Formula One test.

Daytona and Formula Renault
Hoggard started 2020 competing in the 24 Hours of Daytona for Precision Performance Motorsports, sharing a Lamborghini Huracán GT3 Evo with Brandon Gdovic, Mark Kvamme and Eric Lux. They retired after 608 laps due to gearbox problems.

Hoggard was originally set to twin the Euroformula Open Championship and the Porsche Carrera Cup Asia during the year, driving for Fortec Motorsports and Absolute Racing respectively. However, both plans fell through due to the impact of the COVID-19 pandemic, as Fortec pulled out of Euroformula and the season of the one-make GT3 series was cancelled.

Hoggard was later announced to drive for French outfit R-ace GP in the 2020 Formula Renault Eurocup in round two at Imola in June. He replaced Indian driver Kush Maini, who was unable to compete due to financial reasons caused by the COVID-19 pandemic. He retired in the pits in both races but was classified as 18th in the second one.

Formula 3
Having already driven for several teams in testing, Hoggard joined Jenzer Motorsport to compete in the 2021 FIA Formula 3 Championship, replacing Pierre-Louis Chovet, who left the team after the opening round. Hoggard scored his first point in the series, at the 2nd sprint race at Austria.

He drove for Hitech Grand Prix in the post-season test but was not signed to the British-based team or any other team.

Formula One
After winning the Aston Martin Autosport BRDC Young Driver in 2019, Hoggard conducted a one-off Formula One test with Red Bull Racing at Silverstone in October 2020.

Racing record

Career summary

Complete F4 British Championship results
(key) (Races in bold indicate pole position) (Races in italics indicate fastest lap)

Complete BRDC British Formula 3 Championship results
(key) (Races in bold indicate pole position) (Races in italics indicate fastest lap)

Complete Formula Renault Eurocup results 
(key) (Races in bold indicate pole position) (Races in italics indicate fastest lap)

† Driver did not finish, but was classified as they completed more than 90% of race distance.

Complete FIA Formula 3 Championship results 
(key) (Races in bold indicate pole position; races in italics indicate points for the fastest lap of top ten finishers)

References

External links
 

2000 births
Living people
British racing drivers
BRDC British Formula 3 Championship drivers
Formula Renault Eurocup drivers
R-ace GP drivers
Jenzer Motorsport drivers
British F4 Championship drivers
WeatherTech SportsCar Championship drivers
Karting World Championship drivers
Fortec Motorsport drivers